

List of representatives
Kichirō Tazawa, Liberal Democratic Party, 1960・1963・1967・1969・1972・1976・1979・1980・1983・1986・1990・1993

Election results
1993 Japanese general election
Kichirō Tazawa, Liberal Democratic Party
1990 Japanese general election
Kichirō Tazawa, Liberal Democratic Party
1986 Japanese general election
Kichirō Tazawa, Liberal Democratic Party
1983 Japanese general election
Kichirō Tazawa, Liberal Democratic Party
1980 Japanese general election
Kichirō Tazawa, Liberal Democratic Party
1979 Japanese general election
Kichirō Tazawa, Liberal Democratic Party
1976 Japanese general election
Kichirō Tazawa, Liberal Democratic Party
1972 Japanese general election
Kichirō Tazawa, Liberal Democratic Party
1969 Japanese general election
Kichirō Tazawa, Liberal Democratic Party
1967 Japanese general election
Kichirō Tazawa, Liberal Democratic Party
1963 Japanese general election
Kichirō Tazawa, Liberal Democratic Party
1960 Japanese general election
Kichirō Tazawa, Liberal Democratic Party
1947 Japanese general election

Constituencies established in 1947
Aomori Prefecture
History of Aomori Prefecture
Politics of Aomori Prefecture